Friedrich Moritz Brauer (12 May 1832, Vienna – 29 December 1904) was an Austrian entomologist who was Director of the Naturhistorisches Hofmuseum, Vienna, at the time of his death. He wrote many papers on Diptera and Neuroptera.
 
From an assistant in the Entomological Museum at the University of Vienna, Brauer became Custodian of the collections in 1873 and in the following year was appointed Professor of zoology in the University. He was elected an Honorary Fellow of the Entomological Society of London in 1900.

Brauer’s first work on the order Neuroptera, and his first entomological publication, in 1850, was a revision of the genus Chrysopa. This was followed during the next few years by numerous papers on the biology of the order which established his reputation as one of the foremost European authorities on the Neuroptera.

In 1858 he began studies of the life history of the Dipterous family Oestridae; the result was the publication in 1863 of “Monographie der Oestriden”. An outcome of these researches was the erection of two divisions of the Diptera, based mainly on the form of the pupa. The divisions are  Orthorrhapha and Cyclorrhapha.

Subsequent investigations into the metamorphoses of the entire order resulted in the publication of System of Diptera “based upon recent advances in anatomy and embryology”,which appeared in 1883. This was generally regarded as the best arrangement of the Diptera yet proposed. The system which with a review by Dr. Sharp appears in the “Cambridge Natural History” Insects part 1 p. 175 divides the class into no fewer than 17 orders, the old Linnean  “Neuroptera” furnishing 7 of these.
 
Brauer next worked on Tachinidae and other parasitic Diptera on which he published a treatise, in collaboration with Herr. Julius von Bergenstamm.

Brauer identified the Phorid flies collected by the German medical doctor Hermann Reinhard, associated with exhumed bodies from Saxonia, thus contributing to a classic early work of forensic entomology Beiträge zur Gräberfauna. (Contributions on the fauna of graves.) Verh. k. & k. zool.-bot. Ges. Wien 31 (1882) 207-210.

His zoological author abbreviation is Brauer. See taxa named by Brauer and this wikidata query for taxa he authored.

Works
 List of works at ZOBODAT
 Beiträge zur Kenntnis des inneren Baues und der Verwandlung der Neuropteren. - Verhandlungen des zoologisch-botanischen Vereins in Wein, 5: 701-726
1863  Monographie der Oestriden. Wien: 1-192, Tab.1-10.
1866 Novarra-Expedition: Neuropteren. Wien, 1866. 104 pp. 2 engr.plts.
1878 Bemerkungen über die im kais. Zoologischen Museum aufgefundenen Original-Exemplare zu Ign.v. Born's Testaceis Musei Caesarei Vindobonensis.
1878 Über einige neue Gattungen und Arten aus der Ordnung der Neuropteren Lin.. Wien,
1883. Die Zweiflügler des Kaiserlichen Museums zu Wien. III. Systematische Studien auf Grundlage der Dipteren-Larven nebst einer Zusammenstellung von Beispielen aus der Literatur über dieselben und Beschreibung neuer Formen. 100 p., 5 pls,
1892 Über die aus Afrika bekannt gewordenen Oestriden und insbesondere über zwei neue von Dr. Holub aus Südafrika mitgebrachte Larven aus dieser Gruppe. Wien, Tempsky
1900 Über die von Prof. O. Simony auf den Canaren gefundenen Neuroptera und Pseudoneuroptera (Odonata, Corrodentia et Ephemeridae). Wien, Gerold.

With  Julius von Bergenstamm

1889. Die Zweiflügler des Kaiserlichen Museums zu Wien. IV. Vorarbeiten zu einer Monographie der Muscaria Schizometopa (exclusive Anthomyidae). Pars I. Denkschr. Akad. Wiss. Wien 56: 69-180.  Also published separately in Wien,Gerold. 1889, 112 p.
1891. Die Zweiflügler des Kaiserlichen Museums zu Wien. V. Vorarbeiten zu einer Monographie der Muscaria Schizometopa (exclusive Anthomyidae). Pars II. Denkschr. Akad. Wiss. Wien 58: 305-446. Also published separately in Wien, 1891, 142 p.]
 1893. Die Zweiflügler des Kaiserlichen Museums zu Wien. VI. Vorarbeiten zu einer Monographie der Muscaria Schizometopa (exclusive Anthomyidae). Pars III. F. Tempsky, Wien . 152 p.  Also published in journal form, 1894, Denkschr. Akad. Wiss. Wien 60: 89-240.]
1895. Die Zweiflügler des Kaiserlichen Museums zu Wien. VII. Vorarbeiten zu einer Monographie der Muscaria Schizometopa (exclusive Anthomyidae). Pars IV. Wien. Also published in journal form, 1895, Denkschr. Akad. Wiss. Wien 61: 537-624.

Notes

Sources
Anonym 1905: [Brauer, F. M.] - Entomologist's Monthly Magazine (3) 41 73-74 
Anonym 1905: [Brauer, F. M.] - Ent. News 16 160 
Anonym 1905: [Brauer, F. M.] - Insektenbörse 22 45-46, Portr. 
Anonym 1906: [Biographien] - Krancher's ent. Jahrb. 15 196, Portr. 
Contreras-Lichtenberg, R. 2003: Die Geschichte der Dipterologie am Wiener Naturhistorischen Museum. - Denisia 8 47-55, 6 Photos 50 
Handlirsch, A. 1905: [Brauer, F. M.] - Dtsch. ent. Ztschr. 1905 173-174 
Handlirsch, A. 1905: [Brauer, F. M.] - Verh. k.-k. zool.-bot. Ges. Wien 55 129-166, Portr. + Schr.verz. 
Klapalek, F. 1905: [Brauer, F. M.] - Čas. Česk. Mus. Praha 2 79-81 
Kusnezov, N. J.1905: [Brauer, F. M.] - Revue Russe d'Entomologie 5 93 
Musgrave, A. 1932: Bibliography of Australian Entomology 1775 - 1930. - Sydney 31, Schr.verz. 
Nonveiller, G. 1999: The Pioneers of the research on the Insects of Dalmatia. - Zagreb, Hrvatski Pridodoslovni Muzej : 1-390 152 
Osborn, H. 1952: A Brief History of Entomology Including Time of Demosthenes and Aristotle to Modern Times with over Five Hundred Portraits. - Columbus, Ohio, The Spahr & Glenn Company : 1-303

External links
 
 s:Dritter Bericht über die, auf der Weltfahrt der kais. Fregatte Novara, gesammelten Libellulinen.

Austrian entomologists
Dipterists
Austrian taxonomists
1832 births
1904 deaths

19th-century Austrian zoologists
20th-century Austrian zoologists